Orobanche latisquama is a species of broomrape in the family Orobanchaceae native to the western Mediterranean Basin. It is a parasite of rosemary and probably other shrubs (Cistus spp., Genista spp.).

Description
Orobanche latisquama is a perennial plant. It has a simple purple stem with glandular hairs, leaves are a brownish purple also with glandular hairs. The flowers are purplish and characteristic, as the calyx is bell-shaped but with two lobes on the superior half, the column side, instead of being divided into two pieces from its base. Flowers during the spring.

Distribution and habitat
Orobanche latisquama is native to the Iberian Peninsula (in central Portugal and south and east Spain), Northwest Africa (Morocco and Algeria) and the Balearic Islands (in Ibiza and Formentera). In Portugal it is mainly found in the Serras de Aire e Candeeiros Natural Park, Estremoz, and along the Tagus river basin. It inhabits woods, sclerophyllous shrublands and pine forests, on generally calcareous soils.

References

latisquama
Flora of Southwestern Europe
Flora of Portugal
Flora of Spain
Flora of Morocco
Flora of Algeria